The 1987 Sultan Azlan Shah Cup was the third edition of invitational field hockey tournament the Sultan Azlan Shah Cup held in Malaysia at the Azlan Shah Stadium in Ipoh. West Germany won the title defeating Pakistan 3-2 in the final after a goal by Andreas Keller in extra-time. Hassan Sardar of Pakistan was voted as Lucky Star Player of the Tournament for his all-round performances

Participating nations
Six countries participated in the 1987 tournament:

Results

Preliminary round

Pool A 

Rules for classification: 1) points; 2) goal difference; 3) goals scored; 4) head-to-head result.

Fixtures 

Note: Penalty shootout was held to determine the group winner. Malaysia won 8–9

Pool B 

Rules for classification: 1) points; 2) goal difference; 3) goals scored; 4) head-to-head result.

Fixtures

Classification round

Semifinals 

Replay

Third and fourth place

Final

Statistics

Final standings

Goalscorers

References

External links
Official website

1987 in field hockey
1987
1987 in Malaysian sport
1987 in German sport
1987 in Pakistani sport
1987 in English sport
1987 in South Korean sport
1987 in Japanese sport